Otopleura mitralis, common name the miter pyram, is a species of sea snail, a marine gastropod mollusk in the family Pyramidellidae, the pyrams and their allies.

Description
The whitish shell has a clouded appearance, indistinctly banded with pale brown. The whorls of the teleoconch are rather convex, longitudinally ribbed, slightly angulated at the suture. The  interstices are spirally striated. The length of the shell varies between 10 mm and 20 mm.

Distribution
This marine species occurs in the following locations:
 Red Sea, Persian Gulf
 Indian Ocean : Aldabra, Mauritius, Madagascar
 Pacific Ocean : Hawaii, Guam, French Polynesia, Tahiti, New Caledonia, New Zealand, Northern Australia

Notes
Additional information regarding this species:
 Remark: Also as subgenus Pyramidella in Vine,1986 .

References

 Dautzenberg, P. (1923). Liste préliminaire des mollusques marins de Madagascar et description de deux espèces nouvelles. Journal de Conchyliologie 68: 21-74
 Barry D. Smith (2003), Prosobranch gastropods of Guam, Micronesica 35-36:244-270. 2003
  Jean Tröndlé and Michel Boutet, Inventory of Marine Molluscs of French Polynesia, ATOLL RESEARCH BULLETIN #570, 2008

External links
 To Barcode of Life (2 barcodes)
 To Biodiversity Heritage Library (6 publications)
 To Encyclopedia of Life
 To USNM Invertebrate Zoology Mollusca Collection
 To World Register of Marine Species
 

Pyramidellidae
Gastropods described in 1855